The Bravo of London is a 1934 mystery thriller novel by the British writer Ernest Bramah. It featured his most celebrated character the blind detective Max Carrados. It was the first and only full-length novel to feature Carrados, who usually appeared in short stories.

In a later review David Langford described it as "a disappointing performance whose most memorable section turns out to be a recycling of one of the short stories". Another modern commentator observed that it was only that only in this novel "did Bramah's invention flag, though Joolby, a criminal antique dealer, makes for a memorable villain".

References

Bibliography
 Langford, David. Up Through an Empty House of Stars. Wildside Press, 2003.
 Miskimmin, Esme. 100 British Crime Writers. Springer Nature, 2020.
 Reilly, John M. Twentieth Century Crime & Mystery Writers. Springer, 2015.

1934 British novels
British thriller novels
British mystery novels
Novels set in London
Novels by Ernest Bramah
Cassell (publisher) books